GpsGate is a software platform for Internet-based GPS tracking and GPS sharing. GpsGate is owned by Franson Technology AB, a company located in Stockholm, Sweden, specialized in GPS software development. Franson Technology AB was founded in 2004 by the current CEO Johan Franson.

Products

GpsGate Client 
GPS software for Windows Vista/XP/2k/NT/ME/98, Windows Mobile, Pocket PC and Windows CE .NET. GpsGate Client is a client tool that is used to share a GPS between several applications using virtual COM ports, connect regular GPS to Garmin nRoute, connect a GPS direct to Google Earth and send GPS positions to a GpsGate Server. GpsGate Client also includes a GPS simulator and NMEA logger. Advanced users can use GpsGate Client to share a GPS over networks, HTTP, Bluetooth and ActiveSync and multiplex and split NMEA streams.

GpsGate Server 
In January 2007 Franson Technology AB released GpsGate Server. GpsGate Server is a server platform for GPS tracking built around AJAX, XML/JSON, .NET and MySQL. GpsGate Server includes web applications for tracking of vehicles, people, animals and assets. GPS positions can be sent to GpsGate Server over HTTP and TCP/UDP using GPS tracking devices, mobile phones and GpsGate Clients. The server has support for multiple languages.

References 
 "GpsGate review" , "Laptop GPS World", September, 2009.
 "GpsGate software", "GPS World", May, 2005.
 Hanttula, Dan. "Get more from GPS by sharing your location with family and friends", "Smartphone & Pocket PC Magazine", Oct/Nov, 2007.

External links 
 http://gpsgate.com

Global Positioning System
Satellite navigation software